Little Flowers' School is a co-educational higher secondary school situated in Uttarpara, Hooghly by the river Ganges, near Uttarpara Govt. High School and Peary Mohan College on Amarendra Nath Sarani. It was established in 1981 and runs in two language mediums. 

The Bengali medium is a primary one and is run in the morning. The English medium which is run as the day section is a secondary school.

The school was conceived as a side project of Model Education Society, a local philanthropic and charitable society. It started out as a Bengali medium school and gradually expanded its number of classes and included the English medium section. Its first Principal was Late Prof. Syamadas Mukherjee.

The English medium section received its recognition from WBBSE in 2010 and WBCHSE in 2015.

References

High schools and secondary schools in West Bengal
Schools in Hooghly district
Educational institutions established in 1981
1981 establishments in West Bengal